The Malawi Broadcasting Corporation is a state-run radio company in Malawi. It was founded in 1964. It has two radio stations, Radio 1 and Radio 2, and transmits on FM, Medium Wave and Shortwave frequencies and Online.

It also runs the national television station, Television Malawi.

Its headquarters is in Blantyre, Malawi.

Companies of Malawi
Government of Malawi
Radio stations established in 1964
Mass media in Blantyre
Radio stations in Malawi
1964 establishments in Malawi